Spring Fever (Fiebre de primavera) is a 1965 Argentine film.

Cast
Palito Ortega
Violeta Rivas

External links
 

1965 films
1960s Spanish-language films
Argentine black-and-white films
Films shot in Buenos Aires
1960s Argentine films
Films directed by Enrique Carreras